The Mayan black-headed skink or Schwartze's skink (Mesoscincus schwartzei) is an extant species of skink, a lizard in the family Scincidae. The species is found in Mexico, Belize, and Guatemala.

Etymology
The specific name, schwartzei, is in honor of "Dr. E. W. E. Schwartze" who was associated with the zoo in Hamburg, Germany. This probably refers to Erich Wilhelm Edmund Schwartze (1810–1885).

References

Mesoscincus
Reptiles described in 1884
Taxa named by Johann Gustav Fischer